The 2021 Big West Conference men's basketball tournament was the postseason men's basketball tournament for the Big West Conference of the 2020-21 NCAA Division I men's basketball season. It was held from March 9–13, 2021 at the Michelob Ultra Arena in Paradise, Nevada. The winner received the conference's automatic bid to the 2021 NCAA tournament.

Seeds
Of the 11 conference teams, 10 were eligible for the tournament. UC San Diego was ineligible for this year's tournament, as they were in the first year of the four-year transition required for teams transferring to Division I from Division II. Teams were seeded by record within the conference, with a tiebreaker system to seed teams with identical conference records. Unlike previous years, reseeding teams after the quarterfinals did not take place for this year's tournament.

Schedule and results

Bracket

References

Big West Conference men's basketball tournament
Tournament
Big West Conference men's basketball tournament
Big West Conference men's basketball tournament
College basketball tournaments in Nevada
Basketball competitions in the Las Vegas Valley
College sports tournaments in Nevada